A Bit of Heaven is a 1928 American silent drama film directed by Cliff Wheeler and starring Bryant Washburn, Lila Lee, and Otto Lederer.

Premise
A young man from a wealthy background marries a dancer in a Broadway revue, to the dismay of his aunt, who had plans for him to marry a woman of his own class. They conspire to make it seem as if his wife has been unfaithful, and he leaves for Paris to seek a divorce.

Cast
 Bryant Washburn as Roger Van Dorn 
 Lila Lee as Fola Dale 
 Otto Lederer as Sam Maltman 
 Richard Tucker as Mark Storm 
 Martha Mattox as Aunt Honoria 
 Lucy Beaumont as Aunt Priscilla 
 Jacqueline Gadsdon as Helen Worl 
 Sybil Grove as Maid 
 Edwin Argus as Comedian

References

Bibliography
 Munden, Kenneth White. The American Film Institute Catalog of Motion Pictures Produced in the United States, Part 1. University of California Press, 1997.

External links

1928 films
1928 drama films
Silent American drama films
Films directed by Cliff Wheeler
American silent feature films
1920s English-language films
American black-and-white films
Films set in Paris
1920s American films